Mauro Baccelli (19 May 1980 – 27 April 2008) was an Italian lightweight rower. He won a gold medal at the 1999 World Rowing Championships in St. Catharines with the lightweight men's quadruple scull. Baccelli died in a car crash on the Autostrada A12 near Sarzana.

References

1980 births
2008 deaths
Italian male rowers
World Rowing Championships medalists for Italy